Staves is a census-designated place in Cleveland County, Arkansas, United States. Per the 2020 census, the population was 133.

Staves was known locally as the "Y" Community, because State Route 212 created a "Y" where it intersected State Route 35, with connectors leading both north and south from State Route 212's east–west direction.  The road has since been modified and a third stretch of road has been added to connect State Route 212 at a 90 degree angle to State Route 35.

Demographics

2020 census

Note: the US Census treats Hispanic/Latino as an ethnic category. This table excludes Latinos from the racial categories and assigns them to a separate category. Hispanics/Latinos can be of any race.

Education
It is in the Cleveland County School District.

It was in the Rison School District, which merged into Cleveland County in 2004.

References

Census-designated places in Cleveland County, Arkansas
Census-designated places in Pine Bluff metropolitan area
Census-designated places in Arkansas